McFarlane–Bredt House is a historic home located in Rosebank, Staten Island, New York.  It was built about 1840 and is a two-story, wood-frame clapboard house in the Italian Villa style.  It consists of four sections: the original, two-story central section built about 1840; the extension to the original section built about 1860; a wind added about 1870; and a three-story western addition completed in the 1890s.

It was added to the National Register of Historic Places in 1983.

Description

The house, located at 30 Hylan Boulevard, is an early Victorian country villa built in the early 1840s. Its site, a broad elliptical mound on Staten Island's North Shore, faces northeast and commands a magnificent view across the Narrows to New York Harbor.

As seen today, the two-story, clapboard-covered McFarlane–Bredt house (formerly New York Yacht Club) stands on its original site, and although it has been divided into several apartments, the exterior appears much as it did at the turn of the century. The main entrance is centered on the southern side, placed there for convenient access to the carriage drive. The fancifully-designed hood above the paneled double door was obviously intended to resemble a canvas pavilion. Narrow latticed posts support a sharply concave tin roof with a wooden valance of pointed jigsaw ornament depending from the eave.

On the second floor, directly above the main entrance, is a shallow balcony resting on a pair of console brackets and having a delicate wooden railing diamond design. A casement window opens into this balcony and above it is a smaller version of the decorative wooden awning of the porch. All the windows of the second floor in the older part of the house have these attractive wooden canopies above the casements. The windows of the first floor have double-hung six-over-six sash. The cornice is most unusual in that it has an extremely wide overhang supported by very long brackets which are quite shallow in depth, stepping backward in four thin layers with a wooden acorn pendant hanging from the end of each tier. The east wing of the 1870s has a similar cornice in smaller scale with two drops per bracket, while the west wing of the 1890s has rather short brackets with one pendant, each. In addition to the main entrance in the original house, each wing also has a front door.

The western entrance has a narrow porch with a row of jigsaw wooden hearts decorating the eave, while the eastern door has only a small square stoop with a plain flat roof above it.

The northern part of the house with overlooks the Narrows probably was considered the "front" in the same manner as were the facades of houses built facing the Hudson River. The main feature of this side of the house is the long open veranda with flat wooden posts of diamond trelliage and small paired brackets above the ornamental jigsaw work along the edge of the roof. Full length casement windows which have frames with crossetted corners open onto the veranda from the various first-floor* rooms, and centered in each of the three—sided bays is a handsome French door with a demi-lune transom. The outer edges of these two openings are decorated with continuous narrow borders of ruby-red glass. All the windows of the house, as well as the French doors, were originally equipped with wooden louvered exterior blinds, hut these have been removed except for a few which cover spaces that were designed as false windows.

The pitch of the main roof is quite flat, but directly above each of the two-story bays it rises to form a jerkin head gable which aids in giving more definition to the bays and additional architectural interest to the roofline. There are a total of four brick chimneys which serve the numerous fireplaces within the house. The westernmost wing, probably of the 1890s, is nearly square and rises three stories above a red brick foundation to a pyramidal hipped roof. With an additional story, this section would have presented itself as a tower — more in keeping with high Victorian taste. However, since the wing is very plain in design, it was probably intended for use as servants' quarters. The original windows of this section were two-over-two double-hung wooden sash which have been replaced with adjustable louvered-glass jalousies. The entire house is painted a deep shade of grey with white trim; the original color scheme is not known.

History

Early use 
The house was built for Henry and Anne McFarlane, shortly after they purchased the property in 1841. If an architect designed the house for the McFarlanes, he remains unknown. McFarlane himself was an early developer of Staten Island. Clifton, the location of the house, was one of Staten Island's early romantic suburbs. A map dated January 1846, shows the McFarlane house as originally built with a wide two-story central bay fronted by a broad veranda, facing the Narrows. Also shown are an ice-house, a gardener's cottage, stables, two greenhouses, and a fish pond. The greenhouses are drawn as directly abutting the line of the neighboring property which had been bought, in 1844, by John H. Austen, a New York City auctioneer.

In 1846, the McFarlanes sold the land (2.7 acres) and the dwelling to Daniel Low for $9,000. In 1847, Low sold to Richard Williamson, and three years later, in 1850, Williamson sold to Henry Dibblee, of Southfield. Dibblee, a dry-goods merchant, occupied the house until 1865 when he sold it to Almira Wolfe (Mrs. Nathaniel) for $25,000. The $25,000 purchase price which Mrs. Wolfe paid to Henry Dibblee in 1865 was a huge sum for that time and an indication that the property was well improved and in excellent order. Since Dibblee lived there for fifteen years, it may be assumed that he did a number of things which added to the value of the place. He may have done a considerable amount of landscaping, and he must have been responsible for the first addition to the west end of the house which nearly doubled its size. This section featured another projecting room-end and an extension of the veranda. Great care was taken to copy exactly all of the original detailing so that the house appeared to have been built all at one time.

It served for three years (1868–1871) as the clubhouse of the New York Yacht Club and became the second home of that organization. While headquartered in Clifton, the club first successfully defended the America's Cup, the world's foremost yachting event.  In post-Civil War years, the character of yachting changed greatly and immensely rich men who owned large steam-yachts became members of the club. They did not have such an intense interest in sailing and their ships were manned by full-time paid crews. They stepped up the social life of the club and wanted a more elegant establishment — after all, the Royal Yacht Squadron was housed in a former royal castle at Cowes. It was also onerous to have to go to Staten Island and back just for a party.

The clubhouse at Clifton was found to be inadequate for large gatherings and in 1871 it was sold to Frederick Bredt, merchant, for $16,000.^ Because Bredt was the first owner after the New York Yacht Club, his name has been historically associated with the house. Meanwhile, the New York Yacht Club occupied a huge casino-type structure located directly on the waterfront at Stapleton which it maintained as a shore station until 1878.

In 1872, the New York Yacht Club moved to Manhattan where they took up quarters in the Leonard Jerome mansion at Union Square and 26th Street, sharing the building with the Jockey Club.12 This arrangement lasted until 1884 when the Yacht Club moved to a house which they bought at 67 Madison Avenue. The final move occurred in 1901 when the New York Yacht club first occupied its present home at 37 West 44th Street. This handsome limestone Beaux-Arts building with a most remarkable facade which exhibits carved-stone waves, shells, seaweed, dolphins, and the stern-ends of three baroque sailing vessels, was designed by the architects Warren & Wetmore and was designated a New York City Landmark on September 11,-.1979.

Later owners and changes

The former New York Yacht Club building at Clifton has had two more additions since it was sold in 1871. It is not likely that Frederick Bredt enlarged the house since he held it for only three years, selling the place to George D. Ives in 1874. Bredt had a mansion named Beechwood on a very large comer lot across Pennsylvania Avenue (the former name of Hylan Boulevard) and he probably never lived in the villa. However, Ives owned the house for a lengthy period, and the style of the wing added to the east could indicate a date in the 1870s. This wing respects the basic design of the original house, but its somewhat lower ro^f makes an awkward connection to the older section.

In 1891, the property was bought by James Thompson who held it until 1908, although his daughter, Jeanette, was the owner until 1948. It is probable that Thompson built the three-story addition at the extreme western end which stylistically appears to have been built in the 1890s.^^ This section — bold and square and tall — is quite different in appearance from the rest of the building.

In 1948, Jeanette Thompson, then living on Belair Road, sold the house to T. Gilbert Brouillette, who lived there until 1961. In the years that followed, developers purchased the property, and the Austen house next door as well, and ownership changed a number of times. Finally, in 1975, the City of New York acquired both properties with the idea of creating a public park and preserving these choice remnants of old Staten Island on their beautiful site beside the Narrows.

References

 

Houses on the National Register of Historic Places in Staten Island
Italianate architecture in New York (state)
Houses completed in 1840
New York City Designated Landmarks in Staten Island